Probable G-protein coupled receptor 173 is a protein that in humans is encoded by the GPR173 gene.

See also
 SREB

References

Further reading

G protein-coupled receptors